Otwayite, Ni2CO3(OH)2, is a hydrated nickel carbonate mineral.  Otwayite is green, with a hardness of 4, a specific gravity of 3.4, and crystallises in the orthorhombic system.

Occurrence 
Otwayite is found in association with nullaginite and hellyerite in the Otway nickel deposit. It is found in association with theoprastite, hellyerite, gaspeite and a suite of other nickel carbonate minerals in the Lord Brassey Mine, Tasmania. Otwayite is found in association with gaspeite, hellyerite and kambaldaite in the Widgie Townsite nickel gossan, Widgiemooltha, Western Australia. It is also reported from the Pafuri nickel deposit, South Africa.
It was first described in 1977 from the Otway Nickel Deposit, Nullagine, Pilbara Craton, Western Australia and named for Australian prospector Charles Albert Otway (born 1922).

References 

 
 
 Henry, D. A. & Birch, W. D. (1992): Otwayite and theophrastite from the Lord Brassey Mine, Tasmania. Mineral. Mag. 56, 252-255.
 Andersen, P., Bottrill, R. & Davidson, P. (2002): Famous mineral localities: The Lord Brassey mine, Tasmania. Mineral. Rec. 33, 321-332.

Nickel minerals
Carbonate minerals
Orthorhombic minerals